"Inhaler" is the debut solo single by English musician Miles Kane, released on 19 November 2010.  It was released as a limited run on 7" vinyl and as a digital download on iTunes. The song was re-released on 8 July 2011. Matt Collar of AllMusic described the song as "bluesy acid garage." Joe Zadeh of Clash commented that the song is "brilliantly executed, explosive indie rock." The song is based on a riff borrowed from "Mother Nature, Father Earth", a song by the 1960s garage rock band the Music Machine.

Music video
A music video to accompany the release of "Inhaler" was uploaded onto YouTube on 9 June 2011 at a total length of three minutes and three seconds.

Covers 
Cee Lo Green covered the song on the BBC Live Lounge on 1 October 2011.

Track listing

Charts 
The single reached #171 on the UK Singles Chart. It also peaked #10 in the NME Singles Charts on 4 December 2010.

Release history

References 

2010 debut singles
2010 songs
Sony Music singles
Songs written by Miles Kane
Songs written by Sean Bonniwell